Piaseczno  is a village in the administrative district of Gmina Gniew, within Tczew County, Pomeranian Voivodeship, in northern Poland. It is located within the ethnocultural region of Kociewie in the historic region of Pomerania.

The village has a population of 580.

Piaseczno is a regional Christian pilgrimage destination due to the historic Piaseczno Well. Other sights of the village are the Gothic Church of the Nativity of the Virgin Mary and the Museum of the Polish Peasant Movement.

The settlement Piaseckie Pola is part of the village.

History

The area became part of the emerging Polish state in the 10th century under its first historic ruler Mieszko I. In the 14th century, it was invaded and occupied by the Teutonic Order. First records of the village stem from the time when the region was part of the State of the Teutonic Order. In 1353, Grand Master Winrich von Kniprode assigned the local church to the convent of nuns of Chełmno/Kulm. In 1454, King Casimir IV Jagiellon re-incorporated the region to the Kingdom of Poland, and in 1466, the Teutonic Knights renounced any claims and recognized it as part of Poland.

Piaseczno was a royal village of the Polish Crown, administratively located in the Tczew County in the Pomeranian Voivodeship. It was a popular Catholic pilgrimage destination and was often visited by starost of nearby Gniew and future King of Poland John III Sobieski. As king he ordered the construction of a new, greater vault in the local church of the Nativity of the Virgin Mary, and visited Piaseczno shortly before his death in 1696. His wife, Queen consort of Poland, Marie Casimire visited Piaseczno in 1676.

In 1862, activist Juliusz Kraziewicz founded the oldest Polish agricultural cooperative (Włościańskie Towarzystwo Rolnicze) in the village. Due to this, the Museum of the Polish Peasant Movement is located in the village. In 1868, the village had a population of 1,066, predominantly Catholic by confession.

During the German occupation of Poland (World War II), the local Polish parish priest Augustyn Bukolt was murdered by the Germans in a mass execution in the Szpęgawski Forest in October 1939 (see Intelligenzaktion).

References 

Piaseczno